WLRY (88.9 FM) is a non-commercial radio station licensed to serve Rushville, Ohio, United States.  The station, established in 1999, is owned by the Arcangel Broadcasting Foundation, a 501(c)(3) non-profit organization.  WLRY currently airs a Contemporary Christian format of music and talk under the slogan "Radio for Life".

Programming
WLRY broadcasts a Christian radio format featuring Christian talk and educational programs plus contemporary Christian music to the greater Columbus, Ohio, area.  Local programming includes a weekday morning show called O'Riley in the Morning featuring Mike O'Riley with music, local information and special guests.  Syndicated programming includes Focus on the FamilyThe Urban Alternative with Tony Evans, Turning Point with David Jeremiah, and the drama/comedy Adventures in Odyssey''.

History
This station received its original construction permit from the Federal Communications Commission on May 19, 1998.  The new station was assigned the WLRY call sign by the FCC on June 22, 1998.  WLRY received its license to cover from the FCC on December 7, 1999.

In August 2005, WLRY applied to the FCC to change its licensed broadcast frequency from 88.5 MHz to 88.9 MHz in an effort to improve the coverage area of its signal. The FCC granted the station a new construction permit to authorize this change on February 16, 2006.  WLRY received a license to cover these changes on December 14, 2006.

Awards and honors
88.9 FM WLRY received the Christian Radio Station Of The Year Award from The Ohio Christian Music Association on Aug. 6th, 2017.

References

External links
WLRY official website

Contemporary Christian radio stations in the United States
Radio stations established in 1999
Fairfield County, Ohio
1999 establishments in Ohio
LRY